Markowszczyzna  is a village in the administrative district of Gmina Turośń Kościelna, within Białystok County, Podlaskie Voivodeship, in north-eastern Poland.

As of 2006 the village has a population of 140.

References

Markowszczyzna